Moffat or Moffatt is a surname, of Scottish origin (see Clan Moffat). It may refer to:

 Abbot Low Moffat (1901–1996), American politician and diplomat
 Aidan Moffat, Scottish musician with the band Arab Strap
 Alex Moffat (1862–1914), American football player
 Alfred Edward Moffat (1863–1950), a Scottish musician, composer and collector of music
 Alf Moffat (1870–1956), Australian sportsman and administrator
 Alistair Moffat, (born 1950) Scottish writer and journalist
 Allan Moffat, (born 1939) Canadian-Australian racing driver
 Anne Moffat, (born 1958) Scottish politician
 Anthony Moffat, Canadian professor of astronomy
 Ariane Moffatt, singer and musician from Quebec
 Bernard Moffatt, Manx political campaigner and trade unionist
 Dave Moffatt, Canadian musician
 David Moffatt (rugby league) rugby league footballer who played in the 1980s
 David Moffat (1839–1911) American financier and industrialist
 David Moffat (rugby league) (born 1971), Australian rugby league footballer who played in the 1990s
 Donald Moffat (1930–2018) British actor
 Ellen Moffat (born 1954) Canadian artist
 George Moffat (disambiguation), several people named George Moffat or George Moffatt
 Geraldine Moffat, (born 1943) English actress
 Graham Moffat, Scottish playwright
 Graham Moffatt, British actor
 Henry Moffat, American football player/physician
 Karyn Moffat, Canadian computer scientist
 Henry Keith Moffatt, Scottish mathematician and fluid dynamicist
 Howard Unwin Moffat (1869–1951) Rhodesian politician
 Hugh Moffatt (disambiguation), several people
 James Moffat (disambiguation), several people named James Moffat or James Moffatt
 Jay Pierrepont Moffat (1896–1943) American diplomat
 Jay Pierrepont Moffat, Jr. (born 1932) American diplomat
 Jerry Moffatt (b. 1963) British climber
 John Moffat (disambiguation), several people
 John Moffatt (disambiguation), several people
 John 'Keith' Moffat, Guggenheim Fellow and University of Chicago biophysicist
 Jovante Moffatt (born 1996), American football player
 Keith Moffatt, Scottish mathematician and fluid dynamicist
 Keith Moffatt (athlete), American high jumper
 Laura Moffatt, British politician
 Martin Moffat, (1884–1946) Irish soldier
 Nicholas de Moffat (died 1270) Scottish cleric
Nicky Moffat (born 1962), British army officer
 Peter Moffat, British playwright and screenwriter
 Peter Moffatt (1922–2007) British television director
 Robert Moffat (disambiguation), several people
 Scarlett Moffatt, English television personality
 Scott Moffatt, U.S. musician of Canadian origin
 Seth C. Moffatt, U.S. politician from Michigan
 Siue Moffat, (born 1973) writer and activist
 Steven Moffat, (born 1961) Scottish television writer and producer
 Tracey Moffatt, (born 1960) Australian photographic artist
 William Moffat (disambiguation), several people

Scottish surnames